Charles Biefer (born 1896, date of death unknown) was a Swiss water polo player. He competed at the 1920 Summer Olympics and the 1924 Winter Olympics.

References

External links
 

1896 births
Year of death missing
Swiss male water polo players
Olympic water polo players of Switzerland
Water polo players at the 1920 Summer Olympics
Water polo players at the 1924 Summer Olympics
Place of birth missing